José Willams da Silva Mendonça (born 5 August 1983), known as Willams, is a Brazilian former professional footballer who played as a left midfielder.

He spent most of his career in Portugal, amassing totals of 27 games and one goal over the course of two Primeira Liga seasons and adding 118/8 in the Segunda Liga.

Club career
Born in Maceió, Alagoas, Willams was a youth product at Sport Club Corinthians Alagoano, making his debuts as a senior in 2005. On 5 July of the same year he moved abroad, being loaned to Gil Vicente FC.

Willams made his Primeira Liga debut on 27 August 2005, starting in a 2–0 away win against S.L. Benfica. He scored his first goal in the category on 25 September, netting the last in a home success over F.C. Paços de Ferreira that ended with the same scoreline.

On 21 June 2006, Willams was loaned to Paços de Ferreira in a season-long deal. However, after appearing rarely, he signed a permanent one-year deal with Segunda Liga side F.C. Vizela on 26 May 2007.

In 2009, Willams signed a one-year contract with C.D. Trofense also in the second level. He made his league debut for the club on 16 August, starting and scoring the last in a 3–0 home win over A.D. Carregado.

On 29 June 2010, Willams moved to Romania after agreeing to a one-year deal with FC Brașov. His first appearance in the Liga I occurred on 26 July, in a 1–0 success at ASA Târgu Mureș.

Willams returned to Portugal in 2011, and spent two years with Associação Naval 1º de Maio and C.D. Feirense, both in the second tier. He subsequently resumed his career in Campeonato Nacional de Seniores, representing F.C. Famalicão, S.C. Espinho and AD Fafe.

References

External links

1983 births
Living people
People from Maceió
Brazilian footballers
Association football midfielders
Sport Club Corinthians Alagoano players
Primeira Liga players
Liga Portugal 2 players
Segunda Divisão players
Gil Vicente F.C. players
F.C. Paços de Ferreira players
F.C. Vizela players
C.D. Trofense players
Associação Naval 1º de Maio players
C.D. Feirense players
F.C. Famalicão players
S.C. Espinho players
AD Fafe players
Liga I players
FC Brașov (1936) players
Brazilian expatriate footballers
Expatriate footballers in Portugal
Expatriate footballers in Romania
Brazilian expatriate sportspeople in Portugal
Brazilian expatriate sportspeople in Romania
Sportspeople from Alagoas